I Want to Hold Your Hand is an album by American jazz guitarist Grant Green featuring performances recorded in 1965 and released on the Blue Note label. Featuring jazz arrangements of pop songs (including the title track by The Beatles), Green is supported by organist Larry Young and drummer Elvin Jones from his previous sessions, along with tenor saxophonist Hank Mobley.

Reception

The AllMusic review by Steve Huey states, "Even with all the straightforward pop overtones of much of the material, the quartet's playing is still very subtly advanced, both in its rhythmic interaction and the soloists' harmonic choices. Whether augmented by an extra voice or sticking to the basic trio format, the Green/Young/Jones team produced some of the most sophisticated organ/guitar combo music ever waxed, and I Want to Hold Your Hand is the loveliest of the bunch".

Track listing
 "I Want to Hold Your Hand" (John Lennon, Paul McCartney) – 7:23
 "Speak Low" (Kurt Weill, Ogden Nash) – 7:14
 "Stella by Starlight" (Victor Young, Ned Washington) – 6:29
 "Corcovado (Quiet Nights)" (Antônio Carlos Jobim) – 5:59
 "This Could Be the Start of Something" (Steve Allen) – 7:08
 "At Long Last Love" (Cole Porter) – 7:17

Personnel
Grant Green - guitar
Hank Mobley - tenor saxophone (tracks 1-4 & 6)
Larry Young - organ
Elvin Jones - drums

References

Grant Green albums
1966 albums
Blue Note Records albums
Albums recorded at Van Gelder Studio
Albums produced by Alfred Lion